Martin's Famous Pastry Shoppe, Inc. is a family owned and operated bakery company, headquartered in Chambersburg, Pennsylvania. Its potato roll is favored as a hamburger and sandwich bun by many famous chefs, including Danny Meyer and David Chang. J. Kenji López-Alt once considered the roll "the gold standard of burger buns" but has since publicly broken his support for the company  over political donations by Jim Martin, its chairman.

History

In the 1950s, Lloyd Martin worked as a baker for his parents-in-law at Wenger's Bakery, but was replaced in 1955 after expressing his desire to open a bakery of his own. Afterwards, Lloyd and his wife, Lois Martin, began baking potato rolls from their home in Chambersburg, selling them to local grocery stores and weekend farmer's markets, along with cookies, pastries, and other snacks. They were successful enough that Martins incorporated their home business in 1957, converting their garage into a bakery and eventually opening Martin's Family Restaurant in 1967, with restaurant space and a dedicated bakery at the back. By 1978, the restaurant could no longer meet the demand for Martin's Potato Rolls, so the bakery was moved to its present location on Potato Roll Lane in Chambersburg, Pennsylvania. When the facility was initially built it was about a fifth of its current size.

Chef Danny Meyer selected the Martin's potato roll for his new hamburger restaurant, Shake Shack, in 2004. The growth of the Shake Shack chain would bring international demand and widespread attention in culinary circles.

Increased competition in the restaurant business led Jim Martin, Lloyd's son and then-president of the company, to narrow the bakery's focus to core products and distribution through grocery stores. 

In 2007, Martin's broke ground on a 220,000 square-foot second production facility in Valdosta, Georgia, with plans for a 170,000 square-foot expansion. Production began in late 2008.

In 2012, the company announced that it was opening a visitors' center in Guilford Township, just outside Chambersburg. The "Golden Roll" features Lloyd and Lois Martin's original garage bakery and other artifacts from the company's history.

Jim Martin passed the role of president to his son, Tony, in July 2021. Jim remains involved with the direction and strategy of the company, and other Martin family members are active as parts of the company's senior leadership.

Controversy
In 2022, campaign finance records revealed that the Martin family had contributed over $125,000 to Pennsylvania gubernatorial candidate Doug Mastriano. Jim Martin donated $110,000 in 2021, more than twice the amount from any other donor. Customers called for a boycott, upset by Mastriano's positions on President Donald Trump, denial of the 2020 presidential election, support of a total abortion ban, opposition to LGBT rights, and other issues. Chef and food writer J. Kenji Lopez-Alt, a longtime devotee, announced that he would neither use the company's products nor support any establishment who continued to do so. Philadelphia chain Federal Donuts dropped Martin's as a supplier for its chicken sandwiches, in favor of Baltimore-based Schmidt Baking Company. Shake Shack declined to break its relationship with the bakery, but claimed that the donations did not "express the values of Shake Shack", promising "active conversations with Martin’s to express [their] concern."

Martin's released a statement that the donations were the personal decisions of individual Martin family members and the company itself was committed to "the values that have made our company successful – baking quality products, providing excellent service to our customers, and supporting the communities around [it]."

See also
 List of bakeries

References

External links 
 

Bakeries of the United States
Companies based in Franklin County, Pennsylvania
Food manufacturers of the United States
1957 establishments in Pennsylvania
American companies established in 1957
Food and drink companies established in 1957
Privately held companies based in Pennsylvania